Augustinas Voldemaras (16 April 1883 – 16 May 1942) was a Lithuanian nationalist political figure. He briefly served as the country's first prime minister in 1918 and continued serving as the minister of foreign affairs until 1920, representing the fledgling Lithuanian state at the Versailles Peace Conference and the League of Nations. After some time in academia, Voldemaras returned to politics in 1926, when he was elected to the Third Seimas.

Dissatisfied with the left-wing government of President Kazys Grinius, Voldemaras and fellow nationalist Antanas Smetona supported the military coup d'état in December 1926 and he was appointed as the prime minister for a second time. A brilliant orator, Voldemaras represented the radical wing of the Lithuanian Nationalist Union that was increasingly critical of the more moderate policies of President Smetona. Smetona had Voldemaras removed from office in September 1929 and exiled to Zarasai. Voldemaras was arrested in 1934 after the failed coup against Smetona and served a prison sentence until exiled to France in 1938. Returning to Lithuania soon after the Soviet occupation of Lithuania, he was promptly arrested by the Soviet authorities and died in their custody in Moscow.

Early life and education

Voldemaras was born on 16 April 1883 in Dysna village in what is now Ignalina district municipality, Lithuania (then part of the Vilna Governorate of the Russian Empire). Though born to a family of modest means and education, Augustinas excelled at his studies. He finished the public school in nearby Tverečius and graduated from a three-year school in Švenčionys. In 1890 he moved to Saint Petersburg to join his brother who had been working there. In 1902, Voldemaras passed the exams to enter a gymnasium, eventually graduating with distinction in 1904. While preparing for the exams in 1901, Voldemaras met Antanas Smetona who would become his close friend, political collaborator and, eventually, his political nemesis.

In 1909, Voldemaras graduated in History and Philosophy at the Saint Petersburg Imperial University and, in 1910, received his Master's Degree and was awarded a gold medal for his dissertation. A scholarship fund was set up to enable him to further his studies, and eventually he achieved his PhD. After a period of studying in Italy and Sweden, Voldemaras returned to the university (now named Petrograd Imperial University) in 1915 and joined its staff. He moved to Perm to become a professor when the Imperial University opened its branch there (the branch would later become Perm State University). However, Voldemaras was not satisfied with the living conditions in Perm and planned his return to Lithuania.

Political career

Entry into politics

Voldemaras first entered politics as a student in Saint Petersburg. The wave of nationalism sweeping Lithuania did not elude him and the many other Lithuanians in the Russian Empire — prominent voices started calling for Lithuanian independence or autonomy within the Empire. Voldemaras joined the activities of the newly established Party of National Progress in 1916 and joined one of the Lithuanian student groups in Saint Petersburg, representing it at the Petrograd Seimas in June 1917 and the Congress of Non-Sovereign Nations in Kiev in September 1917. In 1918, he represented the Lithuanian interests at the peace negotiations for the Treaty of Brest-Litovsk between Germany and the Soviet Russia. Since Lithuania was not part of the negotiations, he was officially part of the delegation of the short-lived Ukrainian People's Republic. His influence at the conference was minimal and Lithuania was claimed by Germany as part of the settlement.

In 1918, Voldemaras finally returned to Lithuania and was invited to join the Council of Lithuania after several members had left the council in protest of its alignment with Germany. One of the many problems facing the council was the lack of unity among Lithuanian organizations — several were claiming to represent Lithuania on the international stage. In September 1918, Voldemaras, together with Smetona, participated in a conference in Lausanne, Switzerland, helping to unite the organizations behind the Council of Lithuania. Events moved rapidly after the defeat of Germany in the World War I, with Germany recognizing the Lithuanian independence and its army withdrawing. The Presidium of the Council of Lithuania, which had been acting as a collective head of state, chose Voldemaras as the first Prime Minister of Lithuania and allowed him to form the government.

On the Government of Lithuania

Voldemaras assumed power on 11 November 1918 and started forming the cabinet, taking two cabinet positions for himself: the Ministry of Foreign Affairs and the Ministry of Defense. Voldemaras's first stated priority was to ensure the internal stability of the country, hoping that a statement of neutrality would be enough to deter foreign interference for a time. Nevertheless, On 23 November he signed the order creating the Lithuanian armed forces and appointed General Kyprian Kandratovich as the Deputy Minister of Defense—this appointment proved to be very unpopular. Kondratovich, who was an ethnic Russian and was viewed with suspicion by many, failed to take measures to organize the defense of the country and proposed to move the government to Grodno when Vilnius was threatened by Soviet advance. He was dismissed on 24 December 1918.

Voldemaras, together with President Smetona, left Lithuania on 21 December 1918. The stated purpose of the trip was to secure a badly needed loan from Germany and to participate in the Versailles Peace Conference, but the departure generated outrage in Lithuania where Voldemaras was seen as fleeing the Soviet advance. In absentia, he was replaced as the Prime Minister on 26 December 1918 by Mykolas Sleževičius. Furious with the events, Voldemaras nevertheless continued working as the Minister of Foreign affairs and stayed in Versailles representing Lithuania.

The Lithuanian representatives in Versailles focused on receiving recognition of the independent Lithuania and its borders, as well as securing support in the struggle against Bolsheviks. Voldemaras and his colleagues found little support for their goals among the great powers: those supporting a strong Russia saw Lithuania as an integral part of that state, while the proponents of Poland as a bulwark against bolshevism thought Lithuanian independence would weaken it. Voldemaras similarly found it difficult to secure recognition for Lithuania after the end of the conference, with the United States refusing recognition in November 1919 (granting it only in 1922) and Soviet Russia refusing peace negotiations at the beginning of 1920.

In June 1920, Voldemaras resigned together with the rest of the cabinet to make way for the government formed on the basis of the elections to the constituent assembly. Voldemaras did not take part in the assembly, instead returning to academia.

Coup d'état and ascent to power

Even when working in academia, Voldemaras continued publishing political articles and essays, often critical of the government. In 1923, his political writings earned him a punishment of one month of forced labor in Varniai. In 1926, Voldemaras was elected to the Seimas and was particularly critical of the President Kazys Grinius and his government that came to power after the elections of 1926. He saw Grinius as too lenient on minority rights and advocated for a stronger, more dictatorial government in the mold of fascist regimes that were gaining power in much of Europe at the time.

In 1926, a segment of the army that disagreed with the policies of Grinius administration planned a military coup d'état. They appealed to Voldemaras and Antanas Smetona, now the leaders of the Lithuanian Nationalist Union, to support them, both of whom agreed. The coup took place on 17 December, deposing Grinius and installing Smetona as the president for a second time and Voldemaras as the prime minister. To assuage public opinion, in both Lithuania and the outside world, Grinius agreed to appoint Voldemaras as the Prime Minister, on a condition that the latter would uphold the constitution of 1922. Although Voldemaras made this commitment, he and Smetona would renege on it within a year when the Third Seimas was dissolved and no new elections were called. Voldemaras joked at the time that he had promised to hold elections, but made no promises on the year they would be held in. The move prompted the Christian Democrats to leave the government, leaving the Nationalist Union as the sole governing party. Finally, in 1928, the constitution of 1922 was scrapped altogether and replaced by a new constitution without following the constitutional procedures and without any sort of approval from the voters or the legislature.

Voldemaras again assumed the role of the minister of foreign affairs together with that of prime minister, seeing foreign relations as the key issue for the government. In January 1928, Voldemaras signed a border treaty with Germany, in which Germany accepted the Lithuanian possession of Klaipėda (Memel). A trade agreement was also signed with the United Kingdom in the same year.

1926-27 saw the establishment of Geležinis Vilkas (Iron Wolf) organization among right-wing army officers and students. Ostensibly a youth sport organization and registered as such in 1928, Iron Wolf was heavily nationalistic and had a stated purpose of combating the enemies of the state. Their ideology and practices (initiates would kiss an iron dagger as part of their initiation ceremony) were outside the comfort zone of many among the populace and the political elite. Although Smetona was the honorary head of the organization, it was Voldemaras who actively participated in managing it. His personality and oratory skills attracted adherents among the younger nationalist officers, who were favorably impressed by the emerging fascism, and who were displeased with what they perceived as Smetona's more moderate course. On the other hand, Voldemaras was unpopular with foreign representatives in Lithuania, who perceived him as too radical and arrogant.

Assassination attempt and fall from power

The activities of Geležinis Vilkas and Voldemaras's more radical stance created friction between him and Smetona. As early as the beginning of 1929, Smetona was preparing to oust Voldemaras from the government. These initial plans were revised by an attempt on Voldemaras's life in May.

On 6 May 1929, as Voldemaras, his wife and their friends were approaching a theater in Kaunas, they were shot on from behind. At least seven shots were fired, killing Voldemaras's adjutant and injuring several others. Voldemaras and his wife escaped unharmed, but his nephew was seriously hurt. Three Lithuanian students, members of Aušrininkai, were accused of involvement in the assassination attempt, with one of them sentenced and executed. The outpouring of public and international support made it impossible for Smetona to dismiss Voldemaras, but pushed the latter to get even more involved with Geležinis Vilkas.

On 19 September 1929, while attending a meeting of the League of Nations, Voldemaras was ousted by President Smetona after the cabinet resigned. Smetona installed his brother-in-law Juozas Tūbelis as the Prime Minister. In 1930, he was exiled to Plateliai and later to Zarasai, where he lived under police surveillance. It was from Zarasai that he was flown into Kaunas during an attempted coup against Smetona in June 1934. Several officers sympathetic to Voldemaras and associated with Geležinis Vilkas attempted to replace Smetona, but the coup did not have widespread support in the military and was unsuccessful. Voldemaras was imprisoned for the next four years, receiving amnesty on the condition he would leave the country. He chose France as his destination.

Later life and death

Voldemaras attempted to return to Lithuania in 1939, but was exiled again. In June 1940, days after the Soviet Union invaded and occupied Lithuania, Voldemaras and his wife made another attempt to return from exile. He was arrested at the border and imprisoned. It later emerged that he died while in Moscow Butyrka prison on 16 December 1942. His place of burial is unknown; a memorial stone for him was unveiled in the Petrašiūnai cemetery in Kaunas in 2012.

Other activities and personal life

While in Perm, Voldemaras taught Roman history, Greek, Latin and English at what would become Perm State University. After his stint on the government, he returned to academia in 1920, teaching courses and eventually joining the University of Lithuania (now Vytautas Magnus University) in Kaunas. At the university, he served as a professor and the dean of sociological studies. His academic works were highly acclaimed and in 1923-1924 he participated in international scientific congresses on History and Sociology. A polyglot, Voldemaras was familiar with sixteen different languages and wrote academic works in Lithuanian and French.

In 1919, Voldemaras met Matilda Voldemarienė (née Delahay). While Voldemaras always introduced her as his wife, the status of their relationship was not completely clear and generated some amount of controversy in Lithuania, particularly when the couple visited the Vatican in 1927. Voldemaras's political opponents, the Christian Democrats, alleged in Lithuanian press that the couple were living together outside marriage, but the issue was not pressed by the Holy See and the couple received blessings from the Pope. In 1929, the couple acted as the godparents to the three-year-old Valdas Adamkus, who would later become the President of Lithuania. Nevertheless, Voldemaras was considered a womanizer and was known to have had several high-profile affairs during the years.

References

External links
 

1883 births
1942 deaths
People from Ignalina District Municipality
People from Sventsyansky Uyezd
Prime Ministers of Lithuania
Members of the Council of Lithuania
Ministers of Defence of Lithuania
Ministers of Foreign Affairs of Lithuania
Members of the Seimas
Lithuanian independence activists
Lithuanian anti-communists
Lithuanian exiles
Recipients of Lithuanian presidential pardons
Academic staff of Perm State University
Lithuanian people of World War I
Lithuanian people of World War II
Lithuanian people who died in prison custody
Lithuanian people who died in Soviet detention